Jordi Sangrá Gibert (born 27 July 1980 in Ponts) is a Spanish slalom canoeist who competed from the mid-1990s to the late 2000s.

He won a bronze medal in the C-1 team event at the 2000 European Championships in Mezzana. He also finished seventh in the C-1 event at the 2004 Summer Olympics in Athens.

References
 Sports-Reference.com profile

1980 births
Canoeists at the 2004 Summer Olympics
Living people
Olympic canoeists of Spain
Spanish male canoeists
Sportspeople from the Province of Lleida
People from Noguera (comarca)
21st-century Spanish people